The École de santé des armées (ESA) is the only French military school for future doctors and pharmacists destined to serve within the Ministry of the Armed Forces. They are required to practice in the establishments specific to the health service of the armies, in particular the medical centers of the armies, the hospitals of instruction of the armies, the research centers for the benefit of the Army, the Army of the air force, the National Navy, the National Gendarmerie and military units of Civil Security. It belongs to the Lyon-Bron military health schools (EMSLB) created on September 1, 2018.

His students are traditionally called "Santards".

Notable alumni 
 Guy Charmot, a French military doctor and member of the French resistance during World War II

References

External links
 ESA

Engineering universities and colleges in France
ESA
Lyon
Educational institutions established in 2011
2011 establishments in France